Albert Rieker (1889–1959) was a German-born American sculptor. He designed public sculptures in Louisiana and Mississippi.

Early life
Albert Rieker was born in 1889 in Eislingen, Germany. He emigrated to the United States in 1923.

Career
Rieker became a sculptor in New Orleans, Louisiana, where his designs are found in the City Hall and the First Baptist Church. His 1940 bust of Governor Huey P. Long can be seen at the Ogden Museum of Southern Art in New Orleans. Rieker also designed the statue of Jean-Baptiste Le Moyne, Sieur de Bienville inside the Louisiana State Capitol in Baton Rouge, Louisiana. Other public sculptures can be found in Monroe, Louisiana.

Rieker designed "two friezes" on the War Memorial Building in Jackson, Mississippi, which is listed as a contributing property to the Old Capitol on the National Register of Historic Places.

Death
Rieker resided in and summered in Clermont Harbor, Mississippi. He died in 1959 in Clermont Harbor.

References

1889 births
1959 deaths
German emigrants to the United States
People from Göppingen (district)
People from New Orleans
People from Hancock County, Mississippi
German sculptors
Sculptors from Mississippi